The 2021 Première ligue de soccer du Québec season was the tenth season of play for the Première ligue de soccer du Québec, a Division 3 semi-professional soccer league in the Canadian soccer pyramid and the highest level of soccer based in the Canadian province of Québec. 

A.S. Blainville were the defending champions. CS Mont-Royal Outremont won their fourth men's title and first since 2016.

AS Blainville competed in the 2021 Canadian Championship, losing in the first round to Canadian Premier League club HFX Wanderers FC.

Changes from 2020 and Changes due to pandemic 
The 2021 will have its greatest number of participating teams with 10 teams. Royal-Sélect de Beauport will field a team in the male division for the first time, while FC Lanaudière, CS Mont-Royal Outremont, and CS Monteuil return from hiatus, after not playing in 2020 due to the COVID-19 pandemic. CS Fabrose became FC Laval following a merger with two other local clubs.

As with the 2020 PLSQ season, the start of the season was delayed due to the pandemic. The men's championship will run from July 3 to October 17, with each of the ten each opposing team twice for a total of 18 games, with the Coupe PLSQ being cancelled. The Reserve Division will once again operate with each team playing 16 matches.

Teams
Ten teams participated in the 2021 season. The league champion will earn a place in the 2022 Canadian Championship.

Standings 
On 16 September, Ottawa South United was forced to withdraw from the league due to government restrictions and cross-border difficulties, with their played matches removed from the rankings (their record was 1–2–7 at the time).

Throughout the season, the PLSQ teams played friendly matches with CF Montréal U23, with the matches not counting to the overall standings.

Top scorers
Includes goals in matches against Ottawa South United

Awards

Reserve Division
The league operated a reserve division. In early September, some teams (CS St-Hubert, FC Lanaudière, Ottawa South United, and Royal-Sélect de Beauport) opted out of the remaining matches in the reserve division, with their remaining matches not completed.

References

2021 in Canadian soccer
2021